The 2018 Asian Women's Handball Championship was the 17th edition of the Asian Women's Handball Championship, which took place from 30 November to 9 December 2018 in Kumamoto, Yamaga and Yatsushiro, Japan. The tournament was held under the aegis of Asian Handball Federation and acted as the Asian qualifying tournament for the 2019 World Women's Handball Championship.

South Korea won their fourth straight and 14th overall title after defeating Japan in the final.

Draw
The draw was held on 6 August 2018 at the Hotel Nikko in Kumamoto.

Teams were seeded according to the AHF COC regulations and rankings of the previous edition of the championship. Teams who had not participate in the previous edition were in Pot 4.

Preliminary round
All times are local (UTC+9).

Group A

Group B

Knockout stage

Bracket

5–8th place bracket

5–8th place semifinals

Semifinals

Ninth place game

Seventh place game

Fifth place game

Third place game

Final

Final standing

1. If countries from Oceania (Australia or New Zealand) participating in the Asian Championships finished within the top 5, they qualified for the World Championships. If they had both placed sixth or lower, the place would have been transferred to the wild card spot.

Statistics

Top goalscorers

Top goalkeepers

References

External links
Official website
Results at todor66

2018
2018 in women's handball
2018 in Japanese sport
2018 Asian Women's Handball Championship
Sport in Kumamoto Prefecture
Asian Women's Handball
Asian Women's Handball